The Coupe de France 1994–95 was its 78th edition. It was won by Paris SG.

Round of 16

Quarter-finals

Semi-finals

Final

Topscorer
Anthony Bancarel (3 goals)
Tony Cascarino (3 goals)
Cyrille Pouget (3 goals)
Ricardo Gomes (3 goals)
Bruno Roux (3 goals)
Sonny Anderson (3 goals)

References

French federation
1994–95 Coupe de France at ScoreShelf.com

1994–95 domestic association football cups
1994–95 in French football
1994-95